Lašče is a small settlement in the hills south of Borovnica in the Inner Carniola region of Slovenia. It no longer has any permanent residents.

References

External links

Lašče on Geopedia

Populated places in the Municipality of Borovnica